Ohad Shahar (born October 30, 1957) is an Israeli actor and voice actor.

Biography
Born in Haifa, Shahar graduated from Beit Zvi School for the Performing Arts in 1981. He also went to the IDF Theatre. He performs mainly at the Tmu-na Theatre and the Cameri Theatre and has played many great roles within stage adaptations of A Midsummer Night's Dream, Who's Afraid of Virginia Woolf?, All My Sons, Kazablan and The Comedy of Errors. He also portrayed Joseph Merrick in a stage adaptation of The Elephant Man.

On screen, Shahar has appeared in the 1987 film Unsettled Land, starring Kelly McGillis. He has also appeared in the 2005 historical drama film Munich. Among his most recent screen performances was in a 2017 film directed by Doron Eran.

As a voice actor, Shahar provides the Hebrew voices of many characters and is one of Israel's most successful dubbing artists. He has worked closely with other dubbers which include Dov Reiser, Ami Mandelman, Debbi Besserglick, Efron Etkin, Gilad Kleter and more. He is the official Hebrew voice of Mickey Mouse and Bugs Bunny and among his popular voice roles include Zazu from The Lion King, Iago from Aladdin, Gru from Despicable Me, Randall Boggs from Monsters, Inc., Boomer from The Fox and the Hound, Sir Hiss from  Robin Hood and he also dubbed Manny from the Ice Age franchise (except in the first film as he was voiced by Tuvia Tzafir). In his live action roles, Shahar dubbed Severus Snape from the Harry Potter film series and George Banks in Mary Poppins.

Personal life
From 1985 until 2007, Shahar was married to actress and comedian Anat Waxman and they had two children together, Yonatan and Gaia. He is now currently married to dancer Maya Koupchik and they have a daughter.

Filmography

References

External links

1957 births
Living people
Beit Zvi School for the Performing Arts alumni
Israeli male film actors
Israeli male stage actors
Israeli male television actors
Israeli male voice actors
Male actors from Haifa
20th-century Israeli male actors
21st-century Israeli male actors